Alondra Carrillo Vidal (born 23 July 1991) is a Chilean psychologist who was elected as a member of the Chilean Constitutional Convention.

References

External links
 BCN Profile

Living people
1992 births
21st-century Chilean politicians
Pontifical Catholic University of Chile alumni
Members of the Chilean Constitutional Convention
People from Santiago
21st-century Chilean women politicians
Chilean psychologists